Paolo Sollier (born 13 January 1948) is an Italian former football player and manager.

Career
Born in Chiomonte, Sollier played as a midfielder. He began his career with Cossatese, combining his football career with a job working in a Fiat factory. He later played professionally for Pro Vercelli, Perugia, Rimini and Biellese.

He later managed Aosta, Pro Vercelli and Biellese.

Personal life
Sollier, a communist, was active in left-wing political activism throughout his football career, and was known for using a clenched fist salute on the pitch.

References

1948 births
Living people
Italian footballers
Association football midfielders
F.C. Pro Vercelli 1892 players
A.C. Perugia Calcio players
Rimini F.C. 1912 players
A.S.D. La Biellese players
Serie C players
Serie B players
Serie A players
Italian football managers
F.C. Pro Vercelli 1892 managers
A.S.D. La Biellese managers